Maple Meadow and Maple Meadows may refer to:

Maple Meadow, West Virginia, an unincorporated community in Raleigh County
Maple Meadows Station, a railroad station in British Columbia, Canada